Antonio García-Riquelme Salvador (9 November 1894 – 20 March 1968), better known as Antonio Riquelme, was a Spanish film actor. He appeared in more than 140 films between 1911 and 1967.

Selected filmography

 El fantasma del castillo (1911)
 Por la vida del rey o El misterio de la corte de Suavia (1916)
 La mano (1916)
 El misterio de una noche de verano o El enigma de una noche (1916)
 Deuda pagada (1916)
 La dicha ajena (1917)
 La tía de Pancho (1918)
 La chica del gato (1927)
 Los vencedores de la muerte (1927)
 Una morena y una rubia (1933)
 Yo canto para ti (1934)
 Diez días millonaria (1934)
 The Dancer and the Worker (1936) - Patricio
 El rayo (1939)
 En poder de Barba Azul (1940)
 El crucero Baleares (1941) - El político
 Para ti es el mundo (1941)
 We Thieves Are Honourable (1942) - Castelar
 Flora y Mariana (1942) - Fabio
 El pobre rico (1942)
 ¡Qué contenta estoy! (1942)
 Todo por ellas (1942)
 Idilio en Mallorca (1943)
 Cinnamon Flower (1943) - Taranto
 Mosquita en palacio (1943)
 Deliciosamente tontos (1943) - Radiotelegrafista
 La boda de Quinita Flores (1943) - Don Cayo
 Santander, la ciudad en llamas (1944) - Coletín
 Yo no me caso (1944)
 Tuvo la culpa Adán (1944) - Santos Olmedo de Alcaraz
 The Tower of the Seven Hunchbacks (1944) - Don Zacarías
 El hombre que las enamora (1944) - Dimas
 Ella, él y sus millones (1944) - Don Antonio
 Tambor y cascabel (1944)
 The Road to Babel (1945) - Bruno
 Noche decisiva (1945) - Moutito
 Cinco lobitos (1945)
 A los pies de usted (1945) - Compadre
 Un hombre de negocios (1945) - Cochero
 Su última noche (1945) - Borracho
 La mentira de la gloria (1946) - Malospelos
 Barrio (1947) - Hombre en taberna
 Lola Leaves for the Ports (1947) - Calamares
 Don Quixote (1947) - Porquero (Swineherd) (uncredited)
 Mi enemigo el doctor (1948)
 Confidencia (1948) - Redactor
 Las aguas bajan negras (1948) - Médico
 Noche de Reyes (1949)
 The Duchess of Benameji (1949) - Mayoral
 Doce horas de vida (1949) - Gerente del hotel
 The Troublemaker (1950) - Tiberio
 39 cartas de amor (1950) - David
 Woman to Woman (1950) - Gutiérrez
 Gente sin importancia (1950)
 Apollo Theatre (1950)
 El Negro que tenía el alma blanca (1951) - Bélmez
 The Lioness of Castille (1951)
 Cielo negro (1951) - Churrero en la verbena
 A Cuban in Spain (1951) - Maquinista 2º
 La trinca del aire (1951) - Vendedor
 Our Lady of Fatima (1951) - Carballo
 The Great Galeoto (1951)
 Lola the Coalgirl (1952) - Domingo Carmona
 Devil's Roundup (1952)
 The Eyes Leave a Trace (1952) - Sereno
 Sister San Sulpicio (1952) - Revisor del tren
 The Song of Sister Maria (1952) - Horacio
 Doña Francisquita (1952) - Pepe (uncredited)
 La laguna negra (1952) - Ayudante del juez
 Babes in Bagdad (1952) - Omar
 Women's Town (1953) - Telegrafista
 Airport (1953) - Comisario
 Such is Madrid (1953) - Peluquero
 Nobody Will Know (1953) - Empleado de correos
 Under the Sky of Spain (1953)
 Jeromin (1953) - Diego Ruiz
 Pasaporte para un ángel (Órdenes secretas) (1954)
 Boyfriend in Sight (1954) - Antonio Cortina
 All Is Possible in Granada (1954) - Padre del limpiabotas
 Adventures of the Barber of Seville (1954) - Cabo de alguaciles
 Malvaloca (1954) - Silbío
 Como la tierra (1954) - Cañamón
 Amor sobre ruedas (1954) - Viajero enamorado
 Felices Pascuas (1954) - Comandante de Artillería
 Three are Three (1954) - Announcer (segment "Una de indios")
 The Moorish Queen (1955) - Don Nué
 The Other Life of Captain Contreras (1955) - Eleuterio
 La hermana alegría (1955) - Serafín (uncredited)
 El guardián del paraíso (1955) - El Solomillo
 Para siempre (1955)
 The Cock Crow (1955) - Conserje
 La lupa (1955) - Felipe
 La pícara molinera (1955) - Capitán
 Suspiros de Triana (1955)
 Rapto en la ciudad (1955)
 The Adventures of Gil Blas (1956) - Dr. Sangrado
 También hay cielo sobre el mar (1956) - Plácido
 Amor y toros (1956)
 ¡Aquí hay petróleo! (1956) - Timoteo Cano
 Don Juan (1956)
 Sucedió en mi aldea (1956) - Encargado de la fundición
 El fenómeno (1956) - Marcelo Rodríguez
 Manolo guardia urbano (1956) - Orfeo, el concertista
 Dos novias para un torero (1956)
 La ironía del dinero (1957) - Mendigo tuerto (segment "Sevilla")
 Un fantasma llamado amor (1957)
 Un marido de ida y vuelta (1957) - Elias
 Los ángeles del volante (1957) - Antonio
 Polvorilla (1957)
 Sueños de historia (1957)
 Historias de Madrid (1958) - Don Sergio
 El hombre del paraguas blanco (1958) - Pega
 Heroes del Aire (1958) - Andaluz
 The Fan (1958) - Gregorio
 Villa Alegre (1958) - Padre de Genara
 Te doy mi vida (1958)
 Secretaria para todo (1958) - Taxista
 Where Are You Going, Alfonso XII? (1959) - Madrileño
 Marinai, donne e guai (1959) - Domenico
 Gayarre (1959) - Sr. Pedro
 Bombas para la paz (1959) - Loco
 Y después del cuplé (1959)
 El día de los enamorados (1959) - Damián
 Los tramposos (1959) - Pérez
 Nel blu dipinto di blu (1959) - Sor Napoleone
 El secreto de papá (1959)
 Toro bravo (1960)
 El hombre que perdió el tren (1960)
 The Showgirl (1960) - Novio de Rosa
 Compadece al delincuente (1960)
 El cochecito (1960) - Doctor
 Pelusa (1960)
 La estatua (1961)
 La bella Mimí (1961)
 Honorables sinvergüenzas (1961) - Letanías
 Mi adorable esclava (1962) - Bautista
 Teresa de Jesús (1962) - Físico #1
 Vamos a contar mentiras (1962) - Sacerdote
 La pandilla de los once (1963) - El Spaguetti
 The Troublemaker (1963) - Tiberio
 Suspendido en sinvergüenza (1963) - Felipe 'El corcheas'
 Júrame (1964)
 El espontáneo (1964) - Situado
 El salario del crimen (1964) - Hombre al que la policía pide información
 Destino: Barajas (1965)
 Jugando a morir (1966) - Paco
 Fray Torero (1966) - Hermano Servando
 Good Morning, Little Countess (1967)
 La niña del patio (1967) - Antonio, hermano de Carmen

External links

1894 births
1968 deaths
Male actors from Madrid
Spanish male film actors
Spanish male silent film actors
20th-century Spanish male actors